Qaynaq (also, Kaynag and Kaynakh) is a village and municipality in the Tartar Rayon of Azerbaijan.  It has a population of 1,590.

References 

Populated places in Tartar District